Augusta Fitzalan-Howard, Duchess of Norfolk (née The Hon. Augusta Mary Minna Catherine Lyons) (1 August 1821 in Torquay, Devon – 22 March 1886 Norfolk House, St James's Square, London), who was commonly known by her middle name, "Minna", was the younger daughter of Edmund Lyons, 1st Baron Lyons by his wife Augusta Louisa (née Rogers).

In 1838/9 Minna was residing with her parents in Athens, whilst her father, Sir Edmund Lyons, was serving as the British Minister to Greece, when Lord Fitzalan, heir to the Duke of Norfolk, became a guest of Sir Edmund Lyons. Whilst a guest, Lord Fitzalan was disabled by an attack of fever, and subsequently nursed by Augusta, with whom he fell in love. The two married with on 19 June 1839, and subsequently had eleven children.  

Augusta Minna, Duchess Dowager of Norfolk, died on 22 March 1886, and was buried at Fitzalan Chapel in the grounds of Arundel Castle.

Issue

See also
Lyons family

Sources

1821 births
1886 deaths
Augusta
Daughters of barons